List of notable German citizens of Polish origin.

 Jörg Baberowski, historian
 Daria Bijak, gymnast
 Sebastian Boenisch, footballer
 Tim Borowski, footballer
 Henryk M. Broder, journalist and writer
 Magdalena Brzeska, individual rhythmic gymnast
 Claudia Ciesla, model and actress
 Herbert Czaja, politician
 Christoph Dabrowski, footballer
 Pamela Dutkiewicz, athlete specializing in hurdling
 Mark Forster, singer
 Paul Freier, footballer
 Anni Friesinger-Postma, speed skater
 Mieczysław Garsztka, pilot and a flying ace of the German air force during World War I 
 Leon Goretzka, footballer
 Horst Jankowski, musician (A Walk in the Black Forest)
 Daniel Jasinski, discus thrower
 Max Kepler, baseball player
 Angelique Kerber, tennis player
 Nastassja Kinski, actress
 Miroslav Klose, footballer
 Joachim Król, actor
 Sabine Lisicki, tennis player
 Pierre Littbarski, football manager and player
 Tatjana Maria, tennis player
 Angela Merkel, Chancellor of Germany
 Adam Matuszczyk, footballer
 Dariusz Michalczewski, boxer
 Jerzy Montag, Green Party politician
 Matthias Ostrzolek, footballer
 Matthias Plachta, ice hockey player
 Lukas Podolski, footballer
 Ernst Pohl, footballer
 Eugen Polanski, footballer
 Mateusz Przybylko, high jumper
 Erich Przywara, philosopher
 Marcel Reich-Ranicki, literary critic
 Julian Ritter, painter
 Lukas Sinkiewicz, footballer
 Piotr Trochowski, footballer
Bogdan Wenta, handball player and coach, president of Kielce
 Dennis Wosik, kickboxer
 Dariusz Wosz, footballer
 Erich von dem Bach-Zelewski, high-ranking SS Officer
Urs Kalecinski, Professional Bodybuilder
Hermann von Oppeln-Bronikowski, Olympic esquestrian and German General in the Wehrmacht during WW2.

See also 
 Poles in Germany
 Emigration from Poland to Germany after World War II

Polish
 
Germany–Poland relations
Polish minorities
Polish
Polish
Lists of Polish people